The Railway: Keeping Britain On Track is a British television documentary broadcast on BBC Two and narrated by Kevin Whately. It is about passenger railway operations in Britain.

The series, produced by Century Films, comprises six episodes and was first broadcast on 12 February 2013.

Episodes

References

External links

2013 British television series debuts
2013 British television series endings
BBC high definition shows
Television shows set in the United Kingdom
BBC television documentaries
Rail transport in Great Britain
Documentary television series about railway transport
English-language television shows